Shelley Rudman (born 23 March 1981) is a former skeleton bobsleigh athlete. She was the 2013 world champion in the event, won an Olympic silver medal at the 2006 Winter Olympic Games in skeleton and is a former World Cup and European champion.

Early career 
Rudman took up skeleton in October 2002, after a university friend and skeleton athlete introduced her to the sport at the University of Bath push track. At the time, she was working full-time at the ACS International Schools, Cobham, Surrey and was in her third year of a Bachelor of Science degree course at St Mary's College, Twickenham. After unsuccessfully seeking a place on Bath University's skeleton development team, she decided to apply for an ice school in Norway run by the British military to pursue the sport.

The following season in 2003 (after having only three weeks on ice training since starting the sport), she qualified for the World Junior Championships where she finished in 10th position and was the highest-ranked British woman. In 2004, she won the Europa Cup in Igls, Austria. In 2005, she won gold in the World University Games, held in Innsbruck, Austria.

2006 Winter Olympics 
In order to take part in the 2006 Olympics, Rudman needed £4000 to buy a new sled. Her home town held a sponsored canoe event (canoeing from Pewsey to Bath where she was training) to help raise the money. Rudman also spent some time as a supply teacher at Devizes School, a secondary school located in Devizes, Wiltshire.

By the time the 2006 Winter Olympics began in Turin, Rudman said she was aiming for a top 10 position; however, during a practice run she had the fastest time. In the first heat, she was 4th; after the second heat, she finished with a silver medal. Live television pictures were shown from her local pub, where a large crowd that had gathered to watch her race were cheering and celebrating her victory. On her return to Pewsey, the village put on an open top bus tour where thousands of people attended to witness her return.

Skeleton World Cup performances: 2007–2009 
After a summer of media commitments after winning her silver medal, Rudman returned to the British selection races in Lillehammer where she set an unofficial track record.
During the season an ongoing knee injury flared up; she had intensive physiotherapy to get her through the remaining World Cup rounds, before returning to the UK after the World Championships in St Moritz to have immediate knee surgery.

Rudman's best finish at the FIBT World Championships was 10th in the women's skeleton event at St. Moritz in 2007. She later announced that she was to become a mother in October and would be taking half the following season off.

She sat out the 2007–08 Skeleton World Cup season to give birth to her daughter Ella Marie and have a knee operation (although she returned to the Inter-continental circuit in North America in January where she finished second (Park City) and won the penultimate race in Lake Placid), and made an impact on her return to the sport for the 2008–09 season. Rudman won the 2008–09 Skeleton World Cup event at Igls, Austria on 12 December 2008. She then earned her second medal of her 2008/09 World Cup campaign with a silver medal at Königssee in Germany, in January 2009.

She won the 2009 European Bob Skeleton Championships at the St Moritz track in Switzerland, breaking the track record with a time of 1:09.97 on her second run.

FIBT World Cup: 2009–10 season 
Rudman repeated her feat of finishing the season in 2nd place overall in the World Cup, behind champion Mellissa Hollingsworth of Canada. Over the 8-round seasons, she took gold medal wins in Cesana and St. Moritz, a second place in Lake Placid and a third place at Konigssee. The last race of the season in Igls, Austria, also counted as the 2010 European Championships, and Rudman finished with the bronze medal in 3rd place.

2010 Winter Olympics 

On 29 January 2010, Rudman was officially announced as part of the Team GB Skeleton Bobsleigh squad to compete at the 2010 Winter Olympics in Vancouver, Canada. She was the flagbearer for Britain at those games.

An hour's delay to the race start affected the settings Rudman had chosen for the first run which resulted in her finishing low in the overall standings after day one. The following day, after analysing and changing her settings, she set the fastest time of the day, breaking her push start personal best, but the time deficit from the previous day was too much to catch up and she finished 6th overall in the women's skeleton – just missing out on claiming a second Olympic medal. The gold was won by fellow British competitor Amy Williams.

FIBT World Cup: 2011–12 season 
After coming second in the Skeleton World Cup for the previous three years, Rudman secured the World Cup title at the end of the 2011-12 season. A third place finish in the last race of the season in Calgary, Canada, gave the UK athlete her fifth podium finish of the season and moved her to the top of the final rankings ahead of German duo Marion Thees (2nd) and Anja Huber (3rd).

World rankings progression 
 2007–08 36th
 2008–09 2nd
 2009–10 2nd
 2010–11 2nd
 2011–12 1st
 2012–13 7th
 2013–14 3rd
Based on end of season FIBT rankings.

Personal life 
Rudman is married to fellow British skeleton competitor Kristan Bromley, with whom she has daughters Ella-Marie Rudman-Bromley, born in October 2007, and Sofia Rudman-Bromley, born January 2015.

In February 2016, Rudman was nominated to be an International Olympic Committee Athlete Role Model for the Winter Youth Olympics (YOG) in Lillehammer, Norway.

See also 
 Skeleton at the 2006 Winter Olympics

References

External links 
 
 Supporters website
 Women's skeleton Olympic medalists since 2002
 Bromley Technologies website
 

1981 births
Living people
People from Pewsey
English female skeleton racers
Olympic silver medallists for Great Britain
Olympic skeleton racers of Great Britain
Skeleton racers at the 2006 Winter Olympics
Skeleton racers at the 2010 Winter Olympics
Skeleton racers at the 2014 Winter Olympics
Olympic medalists in skeleton
Medalists at the 2006 Winter Olympics
Universiade medalists in skeleton
Universiade gold medalists for Great Britain
Competitors at the 2005 Winter Universiade
Team Bath winter athletes